Alexandra Audio is a Bulgarian dubbing studio. The company is based in the country's capital Sofia. It was founded in 1999.

It commissions voice-overed and dubbed versions of material for its clients. AXN commissions Alexandra Audio to make voice over versions of some material shown on it.

Clients
Bulgarian National Television
bTV (Bulgaria)
Nova Television (Bulgaria)
Cartoon Network
Disney Channel Bulgaria
Disney Character Voices International
AXN
Bulsatcom
FOX Life
FOX Crime
Nickelodeon (Bulgaria)
 and more

Television shows
Kim Possible
The Scooby-Doo Show
Foster's Home for Imaginary Friends
Ben 10
Ben 10: Alien Force
Eliot Kid
Drake & Josh
The Marvelous Misadventures of Flapjack
The Buzz on Maggie
Chop Socky Chooks
Chowder
Batman: The Brave and the Bold (season 2)
Angelo Rules
Looney Tunes Show
Ben 10: Ultimate Alien
Hannah Montana
Teletubbies
Sonny with a Chance
Pet Alien
Sitting Ducks
Kick Buttowski
The Suite Life on Deck
The Fairly OddParents
Have a Laugh!
Jake & Blake
Mickey Mouse Clubhouse
My Friends Tigger & Pooh
 Every Witch Way
 Henry Danger
 Harvey Beaks
 The ZhuZhus

Movies
 Mars Needs Moms
 Yogi Bear
 Shrek
 Shrek 2
 Shrek The Third
 Shrek Forever After
 Rango
 Ratatouille
 Megamind
 How to Train Your Dragon
 Ice Age
 Ice Age: The Meltdown
 The Emperor's New Groove
 Ice Age: Dawn of the Dinosaurs
 Ice Age: Continental Drift
 Barbie (as Ars Digital Studio and Doli Media Studio)
 The Princess and the Frog
 Winnie the Pooh
 Pinocchio
 The Road to El Dorado (on VHS and DVD)
 Joseph: King of Dreams (on VHS and DVD)
 The Iron Giant (on VHS and DVD)
 Balto (on VHS and DVD)
 Lemonade Mouth
 Recess: School's Out
 Kung Fu Panda
 Kung Fu Panda 2
 Mulan
 Harry Potter and the Philosopher's Stone
 Atlantis: The Lost Empire
 Monsters vs. Aliens
 Monsters, Inc.
 Open Season
 The Smurfs
 The Muppets
 Surf's Up
 Cats & Dogs: The Revenge of Kitty Galore
 Beauty and the Beast
 Tangled
 102 Dalmatians (on VHS and DVD)
 101 Dalmatians (on VHS and DVD)
 Tarzan
 Tarzan 2
 Toy Story 2
 Toy Story 3
 The Lion King
 Skyrunners
 The Cat in the Hat
 Sinbad: Legend of the Seven Seas
 Dinosaur
 The Lion Guard: Return of the Roar
 and others

See also
 Doli Media Studio fellow dubbing based in Sofia

References

External links
 Official Site 
 Official Site 

Mass media in Bulgaria
Companies based in Sofia
Mass media in Sofia
Mass media companies established in 1999
1999 establishments in Bulgaria